Wish Tree for Washington, DC is a public art work by Yoko Ono.

As a part of her Imagine Peace billboard project, it was installed in the Hirshhorn Museum and Sculpture Garden on April 2, 2007, during the 2007 National Cherry Blossom Festival, as one of ten in the city and is part of the museum's permanent collection.

In 2010, a wish tree was installed at the Museum of Modern Art in New York City.

Paper is provided for the visitor to tie a wish to the tree.
The work builds on the Japanese tradition of tying prayers to trees. 
Returning the paper back to its source evokes an offering.

See also
 List of public art in Washington, D.C., Ward 2

References

Hirshhorn Museum and Sculpture Garden
Sculptures of the Smithsonian Institution
Individual trees in the District of Columbia
Public art in Washington, D.C.
Works by Yoko Ono
2007 works